The Green Party (PV) is a political party in Brazil. It was constituted after the military dictatorship period and, like other green parties around the world, is committed to establishing a set of policies on ensuring social equity and sustainable development. One of the party's founding members was the journalist and former anti-dictatorship revolutionary Fernando Gabeira (a federal deputy between 1995 and 2011), Alfredo Sirkis and Carlos Minc. 
The founding of the Rio de Janeiro section of the Brazilian Green Party was led by a delegation from the southern Brazilian state of Santa Catarina, composed among others by Olga Maria Carvalho Luz, Luiz Henrique Gevaerd Odebrecht, Marcos Bayer, and Consuelo Luz Lins.

Platform
Among the main items on PV's agenda are federalism, environmentalism, human rights, a form of direct democracy, parliamentarism, welfare, civil liberties, pacifism and marijuana legalization under specific conditions.

The party, however, argues to be in a position on the political spectrum that supposedly goes beyond the issue "left-right", considered by its members to be anachronistic and unrealistic. Many critics also believe that the party broke the limit not to be a small party set in the context of the "legends of rent" (used by political parties only to be elected). This image is rejected by one of the theoreticians of the party, Tibor Rabóczkay, in the book Rethinking the Brazilian Green Party, with the argument that the going round and round between legends is so common in the big parties, as in the small ones. The author, however, acknowledges that in the effort to achieve the 5% barrier imposed by the barrier clause ("law of exclusion policy" in the words of Rabóczkay), the Green Party has opened its doors to politicians who are not concerned with ecological issues and consequently, tend to be amorphous benches from the green.

History
The Green Party was established in January 1986. It was founded by environmentalists and other activists from social movements, taking as their most expressive leaders Carlos Minc, who soon returned to the PT, Fernando Gabeira, Alfredo Sirkis, Domingos Fernandes, Jose Luiz de France Penna and Mr Sarney Filho.

At the last legislative elections, 3 October 2010, the party won 15 out of 513 seats in the Chamber of Deputies and no out of 81 seats in the Senate.

After Lula's election as president of Brazil in 2002, the Green Party was assigned the Ministry of Culture, to which pop singer Gilberto Gil was appointed.

In the 2010 presidential election, the Green Party candidate Marina Silva gained 19.3% of the vote, thus contributing to Dilma Rousseff's failure to gain 50% of the votes, making a run-off election necessary.

In the 2014 presidential election PV candidated Eduardo Jorge, who obtained 0,61% of votes, and elected 6 Deputies and 1 senator. The party voted in favour of the impeachment of Dilma Rousseff. The party later went to support president Michel Temer.

In May 2016 PV withdrew its support to Temer and went into crossbench.

For the Brazilian general election of 2018 the party formed with Sustainability Network the coalition United to transform Brazil, in support of the candidacy of Marina Silva.

In 2022, the party formed with the Workers Party and the Communist Party of Brazil to form the federation Brazil of Hope in preparation of the 2022 Brazilian general election. Also in 2022, in the upcoming presidential elections, the party supported the pre-candidacy of Lula da Silva to form the coalition Let's go together for Brazil.

Green Party in São Paulo
The party is divided in the state in 21 river basins, where the capital are 4 basins – The Watershed are the regional governments of PV in the state of São Paulo. They are bringing together the municipal executive of the party. The state chairman of the party, provisionally, is Belizário Marcos and the chairman of the municipal capital is Galeão Carlos Camacho.

Representation in government
The party is not a major political force in the country, unlike some of its similar Europeans (such as Alliance 90/The Greens in Germany). For a long time its sole representative in Congress was the National Deputy Federal Fernando Gabeira, elected by Rio de Janeiro (1995–1998, 1999–2002; after brief period in Workers Party, Gabeira returned to PV in 2005). During twenty-eight months, beginning in 2003, the party formed the basis of support for Lula's government, breaking up in the second half of May 2005, after stating general dissatisfaction with the environmental policies of the government. Gilberto Gil, the former Minister of Culture in Lula's government is nonetheless a member of the party, and President of National PV is the Potiguar Jose Luiz de France Penna, which succeeded the former councillor Rio Alfredo Sirkis, a former Municipal Secretary of Environment and Municipal Secretary of Urbanism of Rio de Janeiro (also former candidate for President of the Republic by PV in 1998), in different administrations of Cesar Maia. Another ticket highlight is deputy Zequinha Sarney, of Maranhao, former Minister of the Environment in the government Fernando Henrique Cardoso. The party also differs from similar Europeans in low turnover in partisan positions and accumulation of power in the hands of relatively few people. In the meantime, it is equal to the other Brazilian political associations.

After the aggregation of votes, on 3 October 2006, the Green Party reached 3.6% of valid votes, with 3,368,560 valid votes.

In 2007, the National Convention was held in Brasília – DF, marked by legal challenges and complaints about the misuse of the Fund Partidário. Justice has come to stop the vote, guaranteed by point. Some critics of the administration of Penna in national PV were threatened with expulsion or expelled, as Paulo Moraes and Francis of Assisi (ex-pres. The PV / RJ). Complaints pass and the TSE evaluates suspend the fund of the party in 2008. Mr. Gabeira also speaks about reviewing the program's subtitle, which has since been widely criticised in the media.

Electoral results

Presidential elections

Legislative elections

References

External links
Official Website (in Portuguese)
Official web site

1986 establishments in Brazil
Centrist parties in Brazil
Centre-left parties in South America
Federalist parties
Global Greens member parties
Green liberalism
Green parties in South America
Liberal parties in Brazil
Political parties established in 1986
Political parties in Brazil
Syncretic political movements